The Women's high jump event at the 2013 European Athletics Indoor Championships was held on March 2, 2013 at 11:55 (qualification) and March 3, 2013 at 16:40 (final) local time.

Records

Results

Qualification
Qualification: Qualification Performance 1.94 (Q) or at least 8 best performers advanced to the final.

Final 
The final was held at 16:40.

References

External list
Official report

High jump at the European Athletics Indoor Championships
2013 European Athletics Indoor Championships
2013 in women's athletics